Bodelshausen is a municipality in the district of Tübingen in the German state of Baden-Württemberg.

Geography

Geographical Area 
Bodelshausen is situated southern of the Rammert forest near the town of Hechingen.

Neighboring municipalities and towns 

Rottenburg am Neckar, Ofterdingen, Mössingen, Hechingen ¹ and Hirrlingen

History 
The oldest historical documents date back to 1100.

Politics

Mayor 
The mayor is elected for 8 years. Mayor Bernd-Dieter Esslinger's term ended in 2006. Since 2006, Uwe Ganzenmüller holds the office.
 1982 – 2006: Bernd-Dieter Esslinger
 since 2006: Uwe Ganzenmüller

Sister municipalities 
  Soltvadkert, Hungary (1996)
Bodelshausen maintains friendly relationships with:
 Hohburg, Saxony
 Market town Rum, Austria

Sons and daughters of the town 
 Johannes Nill (1825–1894), Founder of private Zoo in Stuttgart 
 Ernst von Wittich (1835–1922), General superintendent of the city of Tübingen
 Jakob Nill (1875–1960), Federal Parliament representative 
 Otto Keck (* 1944), political scientist
 Barbara Schober (* 1958), Multi-media artist and online journalist

Economy and Infrastructure

Traffic 
The federal highway 27 connects the town with Tübingen and Stuttgart, as well as Balingen and Rottweil.

References

External links
 Official website in German

Tübingen (district)